Taras Grescoe (born 1966) is a Canadian non-fiction writer. His debut book, Sacré Blues, won the Edna Staebler Award for Creative Non-Fiction, Mavis Gallant Prize for Non-Fiction, and McAuslan First Book Prize.

Biography
Grescoe was born in 1996, in Toronto. 

From 1990 to 1994, Grescoe taught English in Paris, after which he moved to Montreal and began working as a travel journalist. He has since contributed to Canadian Geographic, The New York Times, Salon, The Independent, National Geographic Traveler, the New York Times Magazine, Wired, the Chicago Tribune Magazine, The Times, and Condé Nast Traveller.

His book, Bottomfeeder: how to eat ethically in a world of vanishing seafood has also been published as Dead Seas: how the fish on our plates is killing our planets and Bottomfeeder: how the fish on our plates is killing our planets (Pan/Macmillan 2012).

He lives in Outremont, Montreal.

Awards and honours
In 2022, Grescoe won a Marian Hebb Research Grant, which is intended to support "inquiry and exploration relevant to Canadian publishing, writing and visual arts, and toward the realization of a publishable work in progress.”

In addition to the below, Hélène Rioux's translation of Bottomfeeder was shortlisted for The Cole Foundation Prize for Translation in 2010.

Books
Sacré Blues: An Unsentimental Journey Through Quebec (2000)
The End of Elsewhere: Travels Among the Tourists (2003)
The Devil's Picnic: Around the World in Pursuit of Forbidden Fruit (2005)
Bottomfeeder: How to Eat Ethically in a World of Vanishing Seafood (2008)
Straphanger: Saving Our Cities and Ourselves from the Automobile (2012)
Shanghai Grand: Forbidden Love and International Intrigue in a Doomed World (2016)

References

External links
Taras Grescoe

1966 births
Living people
Anglophone Quebec people
Canadian travel writers
Canadian food writers
Writers from Montreal
Writers from Toronto